The Stadium of Philippopolis was the ancient Roman stadium of Philippopolis (modern Plovdiv), built in the 2nd century AD, during the Roman imperial period. It is among the largest and best preserved buildings from the time of the Roman Empire in the Balkan peninsula. At the time the stadium was built, Philippopolis was the capital of the Roman province of Thracia.

Today, the northern curved part of the stadium (the sphendone) is partially restored and is one of the most recognisable landmarks of the city among the many preserved buildings from Roman times.

Location 

Today, the stadium is located in the centre of Plovdiv, under the main pedestrian street. The northern end of the edifice can be observed at Dzhumayata Square. The larger portion still lies beneath the buildings along the main street, running south from the visible part where parts are visible in basements of several shops.

Unusually, it was situated within the fortified city close to the walls (most stadia elsewhere were placed outside the walls), in the natural bowl-shaped terrain between Taksim Tepe and Sahat Tepe.

Architecture 

The stadium was built in the beginning of the 2nd century AD during the reign of the emperor Hadrian. Approximately  m long and 50 m wide, it could seat up to 30000 spectators.

The spectators' seats are tiered in 14 rows, crossed by stepped aisles down to the track. The seats are made of solid marble blocks (40 cm high and 75 cm wide) and the front parts are decorated with stylized lion paws. The front part of the lowest row is revetted with massive marble 1.80-metre plates (orthostats) on solid marble blocks. The seats from the highest row had backrests.

Like the other imperial buildings for spectacular events, the stadium had its seats of honour preserved by inscriptions in the marble blocks. Seats with Greek inscriptions were found, proving the existence of special seats for members of higher public position.

The outside walls of the cavea are built from granite ashlars, labelled with letters at some places. The architectural marble elements of the entrance and the orthostats on the front row were tied to each other with lead-set iron cramps. The main southern entrance to the stadium is formed by masonry pillars decorated with marble pilasters and reliefs. On the pilasters there are busts of Hermes (hermai) with prize vases decorated with palmettes placed above them, accompanied by the attributes of the god Heracles (the Roman Hercules) – his lion skin, club, and quiver. In front of the entrance a granite pavement was uncovered, consisting of hexagonal blocks – 0.70 by 0.70 m diagonally. 

The northern curved part of the stadium is in situ in Dzhumaya Square. Also a covered vaulted passage under the tiered rows of seats (cavea) links the track with the outside Roman road next to the city walls.

In the 4th century AD this area was crossed by an ancient Roman aqueduct, the arch support of which remains.

Games 

According to the epigraphic and numismatic monuments games similar to the Pythian Games in Greece were held in the town. To honour the visit of the Roman emperor Caracalla in 214, the games were called "Alexandrian" while the games for the visit of his successor Elagabalus in 218 were called "Kedrisian Games".

The games were organised by the General Assembly of the province of Thrace. In their honour the royal mint of Trimontium coined money featuring the face of the ruling emperor as well as the types of athletic events held in the ancient stadium. A marble slab stone was found during the excavations of the sphendone, proving that there were games celebrating the deified lover of the emperor Hadrian – Antinous. The votive tablet dedicated to Antinous is exhibited in the Plovdiv Regional Archaeological Museum Plovdiv.

Athletes competed in two categories of age – men and boys. Agonothetes (organisers of the sport events) presided over the games. The latter started with a contest for criers and buglers. Sporting events were usually accompanied by music, poetry and art contests.

Restoration and conservation 
The stadium was discovered in 1923. More elaborate excavations were undertaken about half a century later by the archaeologist Liliya Botusharova.

In 1995 the stadium was listed as a cultural value of national significance.

In 2010–2013, the area around the stadium was further renovated.

Gallery

See also
 The list of Circus (building). The relatively small size of the structure, which predicts its usage mainly for athletic games, however, suggests that it is more correct to consider it a stadium, than a circus.

References

 The Ancient Stadium of Philippopolis (official website) - a detailed information and map of ancient sites in Plovdiv, Bulgaria
 The Ancient Stadium of Philippopolis - 3D reconstruction and virtual tour
 Regional Archaeological Museum Plovdiv - Roman Art, Ancient Sculptures Collection

Buildings and structures completed in the 2nd century
Roman Stadium
Roman sites in Bulgaria
Tourist attractions in Plovdiv
Philippopolis (Thrace)